Emperor Xizong of Jin (28 February 1119 – 9 January 1150), personal name Hela, sinicised name Wanyan Dan, was the third emperor of the Jurchen-led Jin dynasty of China. He reigned for about 15 years from 1135 to 1150. During his reign, the Jin dynasty launched several military campaigns against the Han-led Southern Song dynasty in southern China.

Early life
Hela was the eldest son of Shengguo (繩果; also known as Wanyan Zongjun 完顏宗峻), the eldest son of Aguda (Emperor Taizu), the founder and first emperor of the Jin dynasty. His mother was Lady Pucha (蒲察氏), whom he posthumously honoured as "Empress Huizhao" (惠昭皇后). When Emperor Taizu died in 1123, the throne was passed on to his younger brother, Wuqimai (Emperor Taizong). Wanyan Zonghan and Wanyan Xiyin, who used to be Emperor Taizu's chief advisers, convinced Emperor Taizong to designate Hela as his heir apparent (anban bojilie; 諳班勃極烈) in 1132, so Hela became the new emperor in 1135 when Emperor Taizong died.

Wars against the Southern Song dynasty

In 1137, Emperor Xizong abolished the Qi kingdom, a vassal state of the Jin dynasty ruled by Liu Yu (劉豫), a former Song dynasty official. The Jin dynasty started peace negotiations with the Southern Song dynasty. In 1139, the Jin and Song dynasties arrived at a treaty, with the latter agreeing to be a tributary vassal state under the former. In return, the Jin dynasty returned control of Henan and Shaanxi provinces to the Song dynasty. However, in 1140, Emperor Xizong decided to wage war against the Song dynasty so he ordered the general Wanyan Zongbi to lead Jin forces to attack and seize back Henan and Shaanxi. In 1141, Wanyan Zongbi and his army were defeated by Song forces led by Yue Fei and Han Shizhong; the Jin dynasty agreed to negotiate for peace again with the Song dynasty.

Internal politics
Emperor Xizong was very fond of Han Chinese culture because of the influence of his adoptive father, Wanyan Zonggan (完顏宗幹), so he reformed the political institutions and modelled them after Han Chinese ones, while at the same time encouraging talented Han Chinese to serve in his government. In 1136, Emperor Xizong ordered Wanyan Zonggan, Wanyan Zongpan (完顏宗磐) and Wanyan Zonghan to take charge of reforming the government and creating the Three Departments system.

Emperor Xizong abolished the traditional bojilie (勃極烈) system that he inherited from his predecessors. The bojilie system allowed the Jurchen ruler to choose an heir apparent from among male relatives in the same generation as him, usually his brothers. However, Emperor Taizong, who succeeded his brother Emperor Taizu, made an exception when he chose Emperor Xizong (Emperor Taizu's grandson) as his heir apparent instead of choosing from among his sons. Wanyan Zongpan, the eldest son of Emperor Taizong, was very unhappy when the bojilie system was abolished because this meant that he would have no chance to become emperor.

Between 1138 and 1139, Wanyan Zongpan tried to seize power and start a rebellion but was defeated and executed. Since then, the political arena was dominated by Wanyan Zonghan, Wanyan Zonggan and Wanyan Zongbi; Emperor Xizong had little or no say in politics. After Wanyan Zongbi died in 1148, Emperor Xizong gained an opportunity to participate in politics, but his wife, Empress Daoping, started to interfere in politics and she wielded significant influence. Emperor Xizong's two sons, Wanyan Ji'an (完顏濟安) and Wanyan Daoji (完顏道濟), died in 1143 and 1144 respectively. Emperor Xizong felt depressed by the loss of his sons that he developed an addiction to alcohol and started neglecting state affairs. He also became more violent and ruthless, and started killing people indiscriminately. One of his victims was Ambaghai, a Mongol chieftain and great-granduncle of Genghis Khan.

Emperor Xizong was overthrown and murdered by his chancellor, Digunai, and other court officials in a coup d'état on 9 January 1150.

Family
Parents:
 Father: Emperor Huizong of Jin (金徽宗)
 Mother: Empress Huizhao of the Pucha clan (惠昭皇后 蒲察氏)
Wives:
 Empress Daoping, of the Peiman clan (悼平皇后 裴滿氏, d. 1149) 
Wanyan Ji'an, Crown Prince Yingdao (英悼太子 完顏濟安, 23 March 1142 – 13 January 1143), 1st son
Princess of Dai State (代國公主) 
Married Wogula (d.1150) (斡骨剌)
Consort Samao (妃撒卯), widow of Emperor Xizong's younger brother
 Worthy Consort, of a certain clan (賢妃) 
Wanyan Daoji, Prince of Wei (魏王 完顏道濟, d. 1144), 2nd son
 Consort De, of the Wugulungan (德妃 烏古論氏)
 Consort, of the Jiagu clan  (妃夾谷氏)
Consort, of the Zhang  clan (妃張氏)
Consort, of the Peiman clan  (妃裴滿氏)
Consort, of Zhao clan (妃趙氏), personal name Jingu (金姑)
Consort, of Zhao clan (妃趙氏),personal name Saiyue (賽月)
Consort, of Zhao clan (妃趙氏), personal name Feiyan (飛燕), daughter of Zhao Yu (趙俁)
Consort, of Zhao clan (妃趙氏), personal name Yuqiang (玉嬙), daughter of Zhao Shu (趙樞)
Consort, of Zhao clan (妃趙氏), personal name Yupan (玉盤)
Consort, of Zhao clan (妃趙氏), personal name Jinnu (金奴)
Consort, of Zhao clan (妃趙氏), personal name Chuanzhu (串珠)
Consort of Zhao clan (妃趙氏), personal nane Jinyin (金印)
Consort of Zhao clan (妃趙氏), personal name Tanxiang (檀香), third daughter of Zhao Cai (趙偲)

 Unknown:
 Princess of Zheng (鄭國公主),
 married Pucha Dingshou (蒲察鼎壽) and had issue (Empress Qinhuai)
 Princess of Ji (冀國公主), adoptive mother of Empress Qinhuai
 Unnamed Princess, mother of Tushan Gongbi (徒單公弼)
 Princess Supreme of Liang (梁國大長公主)
 Princess of Shen (沈國公主)
married Tushan Yi (徒單繹)

References

Jing-shen Tao, "The Jurchen in Twelfth-Century China". University of Washington Press, 1976, .

1119 births
1150 deaths
Jin dynasty (1115–1234) emperors
12th-century Chinese monarchs
Murdered Chinese emperors